"Only If..." is a song by Irish singer Enya. It was released on 10 November 1997 as the first single from her first greatest hits compilation, Paint the Sky with Stars (1997). The song charted in several countries, and its accompanying music video was noted for its creative direction. Enya promoted the song with interviews and performances on The Rosie O'Donnell Show, Late Show with David Letterman and Royal Variety Performance.

Critical reception
Larry Flick from Billboard wrote, "Taken from her new best-of collection, "Paint The Sky with Stars", Enya delivers yet another great single. "Only If" is as peaceful and memorably melodic as any other of her inspirational, soul-purifying songs, which traditionally are etched with a unique combination of background voices with drums and violin lines. It's a combination that makes all her songs seem antique, almost, if not angelic. Enya can many times take her listeners into another dimension altogether, and this single is a fine example of that." British magazine Music Week gave the song three out of five, noting that it "is the closest Enya has come to a traditional pop arrangement, though the trademark orchestral layers and oceanic sonics are still in place."

Track listings

Charts

References

Enya songs
1997 singles
1997 songs
Reprise Records singles
Songs with music by Enya
Warner Music Group singles